Charles A. Hughes was a Detroit businessman and ice hockey executive. He was one of the founders of the Detroit Cougars of the National Hockey League (NHL) in 1926. The team would later change its name to the Falcons, and then to the Red Wings, and become one of the most successful teams in NHL history.

Cougars career
Hughes led a group of investors that got a NHL expansion franchise for Detroit in 1926. To stock the team with players, they purchased the Victoria Cougars of the Western Canada Hockey League in 1926. They transferred the team to Detroit, where they played in the National Hockey League as the Detroit Cougars.

In 1927, on the advice of NHL President Frank Calder, Hughes hired Jack Adams as coach and general manager of the team. Adams would stay on as GM of the Cougars, later Falcons and Red Wings, until 1963.

See also
 History of the Detroit Red Wings

References

Detroit Red Wings executives
Year of birth missing
Year of death missing